The 2020 Newcastle Knights season was the 33rd in the club's history. Coached by Adam O'Brien and captained by Mitchell Pearce, they competed in the NRL's 2020 Telstra Premiership. On 23 March, the NRL announced that the season would be suspended after round 2, until further notice due to the COVID-19 pandemic. The NRL returned on 28 May with a new draw, the Knights' round 3 game coming on 31 May against the Penrith Panthers. The Knights finished the regular season in 7th place (out of 16), thus reaching the finals but were knocked out after losing to the South Sydney Rabbitohs in week 1.

Squad

Transfers and Re-signings

Gains

Losses

Promoted juniors

Change of role

Re-signings

Player contract situations

Ladder

Milestones
 Round 1: Jayden Brailey made his debut for the club, after previously playing for the Cronulla-Sutherland Sharks.
 Round 1: Kalyn Ponga played his 50th career game.
 Round 1: Gehamat Shibasaki made his debut for the club, after previously playing for the Brisbane Broncos.
 Round 1: Enari Tuala made his debut for the club, after previously playing for the North Queensland Cowboys.
 Round 2: Enari Tuala scored his 1st try for the club.
 Round 3: Tex Hoy made his NRL debut for the club and kicked his 1st career goal.
 Round 3: Brodie Jones made his NRL debut for the club.
 Round 3: Chris Randall made his NRL debut for the club and set a new record for amount of tackles made by a player making their debut, with 71 tackles.
 Round 4: Andrew McCullough made his debut for the club, after previously playing for the Brisbane Broncos.
 Round 7: Tex Hoy scored his 1st career try.
 Round 7: Gehamat Shibasaki scored his 1st career try.
 Round 8: Andrew McCullough scored his 1st try for the club.
 Round 9: Herman Ese'ese played his 50th game for the club.
 Round 10: Aidan Guerra played his 200th career game.
 Round 11: Kalyn Ponga played his 50th game for the club.
 Round 12: Mitchell Pearce played his 50th game for the club.
 Round 13: Phoenix Crossland scored his 1st career try.
 Round 13: Blake Green made his debut for the club, after previously playing for the New Zealand Warriors.
 Round 14: Aidan Guerra played his 50th game for the club.
 Round 16: David Klemmer played his 150th career game.
 Round 17: Josh King scored his 1st career try.
 Finals Week 1: Aidan Guerra kicked his 1st career goal.

Jerseys and sponsors
In 2020, the Knights' jerseys were made by O'Neills and their major sponsor was nib Health Funds.

Fixtures

NRL Nines

Squad: 1. Kurt Gidley 2. Jirah Momoisea 3. Hymel Hunt 4. Brodie Jones 5. Gehamat Shibasaki 6. Aidan Guerra (c) 7. Starford To'a 8. Jacob Saifiti 9. Pasami Saulo 10. Kurt Mann (c) 11. Tyronne Roberts-Davis 12. Mason Lino 13. Sione Mata'utia 14. Mitchell Barnett 15. Bayden Searle 16. Tex Hoy 17. Simi Sasagi 18. Matt Soper-Lawler

Pre-season Trials

Regular season

 From Round 2 the NRL announced matches would be played behind closed doors until further notice due to the COVID-19 (Coronavirus) situation
 * Match relocated to Canberra due to the COVID-19 (Coronavirus) situation
 ** Season suspended from Round 3 until further notice due to the COVID-19 (Coronavirus) situation

Updated Regular Season - 21 May 2020

Finals series

Statistics

30 players used.

Source:

Representative honours

The following players appeared in a representative match or were named in a representative squad in 2020.

Indigenous All Stars
Connor Watson

Māori All Stars
Kalyn Ponga
Pasami Saulo

New South Wales extended 64-man squad
David Klemmer (Senior squad)
Mitchell Pearce (Senior squad)
Jonah Pezet (Future Blues)
Daniel Saifiti (Senior squad)

New South Wales
Daniel Saifiti

Queensland
Hymel Hunt (train-on squad)
Edrick Lee
Kalyn Ponga (train-on squad)

Individual honours

Newcastle Knights awards

 Player of the Year: Kalyn Ponga
 Players' Player: Kalyn Ponga
 Gladiator of the Year Award: Kurt Mann
 Community Player of the Year: Connor Watson
 Rookie of the Year: Chris Randall
 Knight in Shining Armor: Mitchell Barnett
 Club Person of the Year: Luke Huth

References

Newcastle Knights seasons
Newcastle Knights season